Kushchyovskaya is a rural locality (a stanitsa) and the administrative center of Kushchyovsky District in Krasnodar Krai, Russia. As of the 2010 Census, its population was 28,362. Kushchyovskaya (air base) is near to the town.

History
It was established in 1794 and reclassified as a stanitsa in 1842. The settlement came to national attention in 2010 as the site of the Kushchyovskaya massacre.

References

Notes

Sources

External links
Official website of Kushchyovskoye Rural Settlement 

Rural localities in Krasnodar Krai
Populated places established in 1794
1794 establishments in the Russian Empire
Kuban Oblast
